Frank Lopez or López may refer to:

Frank Lopez, a character in the 1983 film Scarface
Frank López García (born 1995), Cuban footballer
Frank López (footballer, born 1989), Belizean footballer 
Franklin López (born 1982), Nicaraguan footballer